Venkatesh is a given name and family name from the Indian subcontinent derived from Venkateswara, a Hindu deity.

Notable persons with the name include:
 A. Venkatesh Naik (born 1936), member of the 14th Lok Sabha of India
 A. Venkatesh (director), Tamil film director
 Akshay Venkatesh (born 1981), Australian mathematician of Indian descent
 G. K. Venkatesh (1927–1993), composer of film music in Kannada cinema during the 1960s, 1970s and 1980s
 Marthand K. Venkatesh, Indian film editor in Tollywood
 Mukta Venkatesh (1902–2003), Indian painting artist
 Masti Venkatesh Iyengar, Kannada writer
 Poojashree Venkatesh, Indian tennis player
 Venkatesh Geriti, Indian political activist
 Pramod Venkatesh Mahajan, Indian politician
 Venkatesh Iyer, Indian cricketer
 S. P. Venkatesh, Indian music composer
 Shanmugam Venkatesh (born 1977), Indian football player
 Shridhar Venkatesh B. Ketkar (1857–1930), Marathi scholar and astronomer
 Sudhir Alladi Venkatesh, modern sociologist and urban ethnographer, American of Indian descent
 T. G. Venkatesh, Indian businessman and politician
 Venkatesh (actor) (born 1960), aka Victory Venkatesh, Indian film actor of Telugu films
 Venkatesh Kabde, Indian politician
 Venkatesh Kulkarni (1945–1998), American novelist and academic
 Vyankatesh Madgulkar (1927–2001), Marathi writer
 Venkatesh Prasad (born 1969), Indian cricketer

Hindu given names
Sanskrit-language names
Indian given names
Given names
Telugu names